The Cape York worm-skink (Sepsiscus pluto) is a species of skink found in Queensland in Australia.

References

skinks
Reptiles described in 1977
Taxa named by Glen Joseph Ingram